The 1884 Cleveland Blues season was a season in American baseball. It involved the Blues finishing the season at 35–72, seventh place in the National League. After the season, the team was purchased by Charles Byrne for $10,000 and shut down, many of the players being added to Byrne's Brooklyn Grays team.

Regular season

Season standings

Record vs. opponents

Roster

Player stats

Batting

Starters by position 
Note: Pos = Position; G = Games played; AB = At bats; H = Hits; Avg. = Batting average; HR = Home runs; RBI = Runs batted in

Other batters 
Note: G = Games played; AB = At bats; H = Hits; Avg. = Batting average; HR = Home runs; RBI = Runs batted in

Pitching

Starting pitchers 
Note: G = Games pitched; IP = Innings pitched; W = Wins; L = Losses; ERA = Earned run average; SO = Strikeouts

Relief pitchers 
Note: G = Games pitched; W = Wins; L = Losses; SV = Saves; ERA = Earned run average; SO = Strikeouts

References 
1884 Cleveland Blues season at Baseball Reference

Cleveland Blues (NL) seasons
Cleveland Blues season